The Aktash is a river in the Kasbek and Khasavyurt districts of the Republic of Daghestan in Caucasian Russia. It has an overall slope of 14%.

Name
Aktash derives from the Turkic ak- ("white") and taş ("stone").

History
The river's basin was settled by the Mountain Cossacks from the 1520s. The Don Cossacks arrived under Andrei Shadrin in the late 1570s, founding Andreyevo (present-day Endirey). The two groups eventually formed the Terek Cossacks. The mountainous area of the river was depopulated in 1877 by the Russian Adjutant-General Svistunov to prevent possible uprisings in support of Alibek Haji.

Diversion of the river for irrigation now means that it usually does not reach the Caspian Sea during the summer months.

Tributaries
Major tributaries include:
 Tsyrkikal
 Salasu
 Yaryksu
 Aksay

See also
 Other places named Aktash or Aktaş

References

Citations

Bibliography
 .
 .

Rivers of Dagestan